Leslie Leonard Alfred Scollard (11 June 1908 – 11 September 1973) was an Australian rules footballer who played with Fitzroy in the Victorian Football League (VFL).

Family
The son of William Scollard, and Clara Scollard, née Spicer, Leslie Leonard Alfred Scollard was born at Fitzroy, Victoria on 11 June 1908.

He married Lilian Maude Moore (1905-) in 1930.

Military service
Scollard served in the Royal Australian Air Force during World War II.

Notes

References
 'Victor', "Found his Break", The Sporting Globe, (Saturday, 19 December 1925), p.4.
 Holmesby, Russell & Main, Jim (2014), The Encyclopedia of AFL Footballers: Every AFL/VFL player since 1897 (10th ed.), Seaford, Victoria: BAS Publishing. 
 World War Two Nominal Roll: Leading Aircraftman Leslie Leonard Alfred Scollard (52451), Department of Veterans' Affairs.
 A9301, 52451: World War Two Service Record: Leading Aircraftman Leslie Leonard Alfred Scollard (52451), National Archives of Australia.

External links 
		

1908 births
1973 deaths
Australian rules footballers from Victoria (Australia)
Fitzroy Football Club players
Chelsea Football Club (Australia) players